Farmersville is an unincorporated community located in the town of LeRoy, Dodge County, Wisconsin, United States.

Notable people
Frank E. Bachhuber, lawyer, businessman, politician

Notes

Unincorporated communities in Dodge County, Wisconsin
Unincorporated communities in Wisconsin